The 1982–83 Chattanooga Mocs basketball team represented the University of Tennessee at Chattanooga as a member of the Southern Conference during the 1982–83 NCAA Division I men's basketball season. Their head coach was Murray Arnold and the team played their home games at the newly opened UTC Arena. The Mocs won the regular season and SoCon tournament titles, the latter earning the Mocs an automatic bid to the 1983 NCAA tournament. Participating in the Big Dance for the third straight year, Chattanooga was beaten in the opening round by No. 8 seed Maryland, 52–51.

Roster

Source:

Schedule and results

|-
!colspan=9 style=| Regular season

|-
!colspan=9 style=| SoCon tournament

|-
!colspan=9 style=| NCAA tournament

Source:

Rankings

References

Chattanooga Mocs
Chattanooga Mocs men's basketball seasons
Chattanooga Mocs
Chattanooga Mocs
Chattanooga Mocs